Lymphokine-activated killer T-cell-originated protein kinase is an enzyme that in humans is encoded by the PBK gene.

The protein encoded by this gene is a serine/threonine kinase related to the dual specific mitogen-activated protein kinase kinase (MAPKK) family. Evidence suggests that mitotic phosphorylation is required for its catalytic activity. This mitotic kinase may be involved in the activation of lymphoid cells and support testicular functions, with a suggested role in the process of spermatogenesis.

References

Further reading

External links